Adrianus 'André' Petrus van Troost (born 2 October 1972 in Schiedam, South Holland) is a Dutch businessman and former cricketer.

A right-arm fast bowler van Troost represented his nation at ICC Trophy level between 1990 and 1997, taking thirteen wickets in nine matches at the bowling average of 17.38.

Playing career
Van Troost played for Somerset in English county cricket and Griqualand West in South African provincial cricket.

Van Troost took 3-27 for the Netherlands in their surprise victory against the West Indies in a limited-over match in 1991, his wickets including Richie Richardson and Jeff Dujon.

Van Troost was an aggressive bowler: in 1995, whilst playing for Somerset, he bowled a bouncer to West Indies batsman Jimmy Adams, which resulted in Adams being hospitalised with a fractured cheekbone. Just a week later, umpire Barry Dudleston ordered him out of the bowling attack for intimidatory bowling in a match against Kent. On Test Match Special on 30 June 2010 Mark Butcher stated that at The Oval in around 1995 van Troost had bowled the fastest spell of bowling he had ever faced, describing Waqar Younis as looking like "a medium pace bowler by comparison".

Later career
In September 2008, van Troost was appointed as the chief executive of the Royal Dutch Cricket Association but resigned less than five months later to resume his business career.  His career has included working for Procter & Gamble, Danone and Lely, where he was appointed as CEO in 2020.

Family
His brother Luuk van Troost has also played cricket for the Netherlands.

References

1972 births
Living people
Dutch cricketers
Somerset cricketers
Griqualand West cricketers
Sportspeople from Schiedam
Dutch expatriate sportspeople in England
Dutch expatriates in South Africa
Dutch expatriate sportspeople in South Africa